The 1961 Campeonato Argentino de Rugby  was won by Mar del Plata who defeated Rosario in the final.
There were several changes in this tournament: 
 The selection of Provincia and Capital merged in the selection of Buenos Aires
 The teams were divided in four zones with a round-robin pool.
 For the first time success went to a team outside the direct control of the U.A.R.
 For the second time a foreigner was called to referee some matches of the championship: James Taylor of Scotland, who was also invited for a one-month educational visit for Argentine referees.

Rugby Union in Argentina in 1961 
 Argentina won the third edition of South American Rugby Championship.

 The Buenos Aires Championship was won by C.A.S.I.
 The Cordoba Province Championship was won by Universitario and La Tablada.
 The North-East Championship was won by Nat. y Gimnasia and Tucumán RC.

Preliminaries 

 Ranking: 1. Rosario, 2. Buenos Aires, 3. Santa Fe

 Ranking: 1. Mar del Plata, 2. Sur, 3. Rio Negro y Neuquén 

 Ranking: 1. Norte, 2. Valle del Lerma 3. Cordoba

(Rio Cuarto withdrew)

Final Phase

Semifinals

Final 

Mar del Plata:   Sastre O., Beverino G., Prieto L., Mollo A., Marenco C., Tiribelli H., Meyer R., Larosa R., Ferrari E., Ferrari L., Olivera C., Boublath R., Arroyo O., Esnaola M. (cap.), Vial S. 
 Rosario:: Caballero J., Mauro R., Puccio A., Dimaje J., Abalos R., Orengo J., Conti R., Villar W., Cerfoglio R. (cap.), Paillole C., Paquez E., Ferraro M., Esmendi R., Carosini A., Gómez Kenney J.

Notes 

 Rugby Archive

Bibliography 
  Memorias de la UAR 1961
  XVII Campeonato Argentino

Campeonato Argentino de Rugby
Argentina
rugby